The 1898–99 Burnley F.C. season was the 17th season in the history of Burnley Football Club and their 11th in the Football League.

Football League

Match results

Final league position

FA Cup

References

Burnley F.C. seasons
Burnley